is a Nippon Professional Baseball player for the Yomiuri Giants in Japan's Central League.

External links

Living people
1986 births
Honolulu Sharks players
Japanese expatriate baseball players in the United States
Baseball people from Iwate Prefecture
People from Ichinoseki, Iwate
Yomiuri Giants players